"Living with a Hernia" is a song by "Weird Al" Yankovic. The song is a parody of "Living in America" by James Brown, from the film Rocky IV. The song mostly describes the terrible "aggravation" and "back pain" that a hernia causes. The narrator himself claims to be suffering from a hernia, and that he's "Got to have an operation".

Recording

"Living with a Hernia" is a spoof of "Living in America" by Dan Hartman and Charlie Midnight (which was also the theme to the 1985 film  Rocky IV). As the title suggests, it is about hernias. When it came time to pick a song to parody as the lead single for Polka Party! Scotti Brothers Records "had some very strong ideas" and wished to have Yankovic parody a musician who was signed on the same label. After "Living in America" became a hit, the record label insisted that Yankovic parody the song, to which Yankovic obliged. In order to accurately write the song, Yankovic researched the various types of hernias. On August 4, 1986, Yankovic began recording parodies for Polka Party!, starting with "Living With a Hernia".

Critical reception
The single received mostly mixed reviews. Eugene Chadbourne of AllMusic was critical of the parody, and wrote that "'Living in America' in its original version has all the overblown grandeur needed to make a good parody target, but 'Living With a Hernia' just isn't funny." Christopher Thelen of the Daily Vault noted that "Yankovic even falls flat tackling" Brown with this parody. In a positive review, Keith Thomas of The Atlanta Journal-Constitution called the single "a comical classic", praising Yankovic's lampooning of Brown's stage performance. He was particularly pleased with Yankovic naming specific types of hernias as opposed to cities in the United States. He concluded that, "Some people say Weird Al's appeal will wear out [but] I beg to differ."

Music video
Yankovic noted that "it was a real thrill to do James Brown. I'm a total non-dancer, never went to any dances in high school, but if I analytically dissect a dance routine I can figure it out." Choreographer Chester Whitmore was hired to accurately create the dance scenes featured in the video, which was shot on the concert set used in the movie Rocky IV.

Track listing
 "Living with a Hernia" – 3:16
 "Don't Wear Those Shoes" – 3:35

See also
List of singles by "Weird Al" Yankovic
List of songs by "Weird Al" Yankovic

References

Footnotes

Bibliography

External links
"Living with a Hernia" music video on YouTube/VEVO

Songs about diseases and disorders
"Weird Al" Yankovic songs
1986 singles
Songs written by Charlie Midnight
Songs with lyrics by "Weird Al" Yankovic
1986 songs
Funk songs
James Brown
Scotti Brothers Records singles